Henriettea odorata is a species of plant in the family Melastomataceae. It is native northern South America, from Ecuador to Nicaragua.  Its natural habitat is subtropical or tropical moist montane forests.

References

odorata
Flora of Ecuador
Flora of Colombia
Flora of Costa Rica
Flora of Nicaragua
Taxonomy articles created by Polbot